The 2013–14 Niagara Purple Eagles men's basketball team represented Niagara University during the 2013–14 NCAA Division I men's basketball season. The Purple Eagles, led by first year head coach Chris Casey, played their home games at the Gallagher Center and were members of the Metro Atlantic Athletic Conference. They finished the season 7–26, 3–17 in MAAC play to finish in last place. They advanced to the quarterfinals of the MAAC tournament where they lost to Quinnipiac.

Roster

Schedule

|-
!colspan=9 style="background:#461D7C; color:#FFFFFF;"| Exhibition

|-
!colspan=9 style="background:#461D7C; color:#FFFFFF;"| Regular season

|-
!colspan=9 style="background:#461D7C; color:#FFFFFF;"| 2014 MAAC tournament

References

Niagara Purple Eagles men's basketball seasons
Niagara
Niagara Purple Eagles men's basketball
Niagara Purple Eagles men's basketball